"Escapades" is a song recorded by American rapper Azealia Banks for her planned second album, Fantasea II: The Second Wave. Production of the song was handled by O/W/W/W/L/S, while the song was penned by Banks alone. The original version of the song was released as a free streaming single, on June 26, 2017, to Banks' SoundCloud. A "radio edit" of the song was released to SoundCloud on August 9, 2017. On September 1, 2017, Banks released the final version of the song to iTunes.

Background
The song was originally conceived as the unreleased track "Bizarra", produced by Disclosure, which was intended for Banks' debut studio album Broke with Expensive Taste. Banks has said that she will be solely singing on the track, and has described it as "very orgasmic" although not being "a sexual song," with more singing than rap.

Reception
Anna Gaca, a writer for Spin, described the first two of the three versions of the song as "works-in-progress".

Track listing
 Streaming
 "Escapades" (48k Monitor Mix) – 3:53

 Streaming
 "Escapades" (Stereo Mix) – 4:04

 Streaming
 "Escapades" (Radio Edit) – 4:04

 Digital Download
 "Escapades" – 4:04

Release history

References

2017 songs
Azealia Banks songs
Songs written by Azealia Banks